Zhang Xi or Xi Zhang may refer to:

 Zhang Xi (Tang dynasty), chancellor of the Chinese Tang dynasty
 Zhang Xi (PRC politician), the first Communist Party chief of Henan
 Zhang Xi (beach volleyball) (born 1985), female player from China
 Zhang Xi (chemist), scientist and member of the Chinese Academy of Sciences
 Xi Zhang (artist) (born 1984), Chinese-American artist
 Xi Zhang (professor)